Lake County Executive Airport , formerly Lost Nation Airport, is a public use airport in Lake County, Ohio, United States. The airport's name was changed from Lost Nation Airport to Lake County Executive Airport, alternately "Lake County Executive Airport at Lost Nation Field", in March 2020.

This airport was included in the National Plan of Integrated Airport Systems for 2011–2015, which categorized it as a general aviation reliever airport for Cleveland Hopkins International Airport.

Facilities and aircraft 
Lake County Executive Airport covers an area of 400 acres (162 ha) at an elevation of 626 feet (191 m) above mean sea level. It has two runways with asphalt surfaces: 5/23 is 5,028 by 100 feet (1,533 x 30 m) and 10/28 is 4,272 by 100 feet (1,302 x 30 m).

For the 12-month period ending July 28, 2011, the airport had 45,085 aircraft operations, an average of 123 per day: 97% general aviation, 3% air taxi, and <1% military.
At that time there were 73 aircraft based at this airport: 80% single-engine, 19% multi-engine, and 1% jet.

References

External links 
 Aerial photo as of September 2000 from USGS The National Map via MSR Maps
 

Airports in Ohio
Transportation buildings and structures in Lake County, Ohio